The Ocala Historic Commercial District is a U.S. Historic District (designated as such on June 3, 1999) located in Ocala, Florida. It contains 20 historic buildings.

References

Ocala, Florida
National Register of Historic Places in Marion County, Florida
Historic districts on the National Register of Historic Places in Florida